Hot Springs County School District #1 is a public school district based in Thermopolis, Wyoming, United States.

Geography
Hot Springs County School District #1 serves all of Hot Springs County, including the following communities:

Incorporated places
Town of East Thermopolis
Town of Kirby
Town of Thermopolis
Census-designated places (Note: All census-designated places are unincorporated.)
Lucerne
Owl Creek

Schools
Hot Springs County High School (Grades 9–12)
Thermopolis Middle School (Grades 6–8)
Ralph Witters Elementary School (Grades K-5)

Student demographics
The following figures are as of October 1, 2020.

Total District Enrollment: 644
Student enrollment by gender
Male: 339 (52.64%)
Female: 305 (47.36%)
Student enrollment by ethnicity
White (not Hispanic): 563 (87.42%)
Hispanic: 36 (5.59%)
American Indian or Alaskan Native: 11 (1.71%)
Black (not Hispanic): 5 (0.78%)
Asian or Pacific Islander: 1 (0.16%)

See also
List of school districts in Wyoming

References

External links
Hot Springs County School District #1 – official site.

Education in Hot Springs County, Wyoming
School districts in Wyoming